Parliamentary elections were held in Ecuador on 1 June 1994. Only the district members of the House of Representatives were elected. The Social Christian Party emerged as the largest party, winning 23 of the 65 seats up for election.

Results

References

Elections in Ecuador
1994 in Ecuador
Ecuador